Sir Peter Warburton JP (c. 1540 – 7 September 1621) was a British judge. Born to Thomas Warburton and his wife Anne, Warburton attended Staple Inn before joining Lincoln's Inn on 2 May 1562. He was called to the Bar there in February 1572, and became a Bencher in 1582. A Justice of the Peace for Chester, he was recommended as a potential Member of Parliament for that seat, but after being rejected was instead elected for Newcastle-under-Lyme, later sitting for the City of Chester in the Parliaments of 1586, 1589, and 1597. In 1593 he became a Serjeant-at-Law, and on 24 November 1600 was made a Justice of the Common Pleas. As a Justice he was one of those who supported Sir Edward Coke's majority judgment in Dr. Bonham's Case, and he discharged his duties as "an ancient, reverend and learned judge" until his death in office on 7 September 1621.

References

Bibliography
 
 

Justices of the Common Pleas
1540s births
1621 deaths
17th-century English judges
Members of the Parliament of England for Newcastle-under-Lyme
English MPs 1586–1587
English MPs 1589
English MPs 1597–1598
16th-century English judges
16th-century English lawyers
Serjeants-at-law (England)